Krivus Island is the mostly ice-covered island on the east side of Johannessen Harbour in the Pitt group of Biscoe Islands, Antarctica.  The feature extends 920 m in north-south direction and 1.06 km in east-west direction.

The island is named after the medieval fortress of Krivus in Southern Bulgaria.

Location
British mapping in 1971.

Maps
 British Antarctic Territory: Graham Coast.  Scale 1:200000 topographic map.  DOS 610 Series, Sheet W 65 64.  Directorate of Overseas Surveys, UK, 1971.
 Antarctic Digital Database (ADD). Scale 1:250000 topographic map of Antarctica. Scientific Committee on Antarctic Research (SCAR). Since 1993, regularly upgraded and updated.

References
 Bulgarian Antarctic Gazetteer. Antarctic Place-names Commission. (details in Bulgarian, basic data in English)
 Krivus Island. SCAR Composite Antarctic Gazetteer.

External links
 Krivus Island. Copernix satellite image

Islands of the Biscoe Islands
Bulgaria and the Antarctic